Just A Pinch Recipes is a digital recipe and social network hub headquartered in Nashville, Tennessee. Founded in 2010, home cooks submit their own recipes and save recipes from around the internet to their digital recipe boxes.

History
Just A Pinch was founded in 2010 and is a subsidiary of American Hometown Media (AHM). Both were conceived and founded by Dan Hammond.

References

External links
Official Website
Asian Food Recipes
Stevehacks Recipes

American cooking websites